Malín Falú (born June 28, 1946) is an American journalist and model from Puerto Rico. She is a popular personality on Spanish language radio in New York City.

The daughter of Juan Falú Zarzuela and Malén Pesante, she was born in Santurce. Falú received a bachelor's degree in social science from the University of Puerto Rico and a master's degree from the New School of Social Research. She also attended the Allen & Singer Broadcasting School in New Jersey.

Falú worked as a model in New York City and was host of a Spanish language version of the television program Soul Train.

In 1973, she was named Woman of the Year by El Nuevo Día.

In 2006, her program Diálogo de Costa a Costa received a Beacon Award from the Association of Cable Communicators.

References

External links 
  
 Malín Falú (1946- ), Will Guzmán, June 5, 2020, BlackPast.org

1946 births
Living people
People from Santurce, Puerto Rico
Puerto Rican journalists